Boualem Miloudi (born 29 May 1965) is an Algerian judoka. He competed in the men's heavyweight event at the 1988 Summer Olympics.

References

External links
 

1965 births
Living people
Algerian male judoka
Olympic judoka of Algeria
Judoka at the 1988 Summer Olympics
Place of birth missing (living people)
21st-century Algerian people
African Games medalists in judo
African Games bronze medalists for Algeria
Competitors at the 1987 All-Africa Games
20th-century Algerian people